Colombia–Nicaragua relations entail the diplomatic relations between the Republic of Colombia and the Republic of Nicaragua. The relationship between the two Hispanic American countries has evolved amid conflicts over the San Andrés y Providencia Islands located in the Caribbean sea close to the Nicaraguan shoreline and the maritime boundaries covering 150,000 km2 that included the islands of San Andrés, Providencia and Santa Catalina and the banks of Roncador, Serrana, Serranilla and Quitasueño as well as the 82nd meridian west which Colombia claims as a border but which the International Court has sided with Nicaragua in disavowing. The sea around the archipelago has been under Colombian control since 1931 when a treaty was signed during US occupation of Nicaragua, giving Colombia control over the area.

History

War in Central America
In 1985 during the Sandinista revolution in Nicaragua, Colombia headed by President Belisario Betancur was part of the Contadora Group along Panama, Mexico and Venezuela. The United Nations-supported group intended to promote peace in El Salvador, Nicaragua and Guatemala, which were engulfed in internal armed conflicts.

San Andres archipelago and maritime dispute

Colombia considered that the Esguerra-Bárcenas Treaty signed between 1928 and 1930 supported their claim on the sovereignty over the islands.

Nicaragua considered the Esguerra-Bárcenas treaty invalid and argued that at the time it was signed, Nicaragua was invaded by the United States. It also appealed to the Pact of Bogota of 1948, under article 31 of which both countries agreed to comply with the International Court of Justice (ICJ). Colombia considers this pact as invalid since article 6 in the same document specifies that the pact would not apply to previously resolved disputes referring to the Esguerra-Bárcenas treaty.

International Court of Justice case
On December 6, 2001, Nicaragua filed a complaint against Colombia at the International Court of Justice (ICJ) in an attempt to resolve the dispute.

President of Nicaragua Daniel Ortega also claimed that Colombia was too far from San Andres to have sovereignty over these and also accused Colombia of being "imperialist" and "expansionist". On December 12, 2007, Ortega also ordered the Nicaraguan military to be prepared for conflict with Colombia. The Colombian government answered that they would wait for the ICJ resolution and were going to ignore Ortega.

On December 13, 2007, the International Court of Justice was set to resolve at 10 AM. The court finally concluded the long time dispute in favor of Colombia over the sovereignty over the San Andres Archipelago but also said that it had jurisdiction over the other aspects of the maritime dispute.

On 19 November 2012, the ICJ decided this case by upholding Colombia's sovereignty over San Andres y Providencia, and other disputed islands. It also settled the maritime boundaries, allocating about 40% of the maritime territory in the west of San Andrés to Nicaragua.

In September 2021, the International Court of Justice heard Nicaragua and Colombia on "alleged violations of sovereign rights and maritime spaces in the Caribbean sea". Nicaragua argues Colombia doesn't want to comply with the ICJ's ruling while Colombia claims Nicaragua violates "inalienable rights" of the Raizals.

Unresolved maritime dispute
The Colombian newspaper El Espectador said that Nicaragua could gain territory in this way by setting a new trial to resolve the maritime boundaries that were not previously established in any of the accords or treaties and the Roncador, Quitasueño y Serrana banks. Regarding this Colombia used as border the 82° meridian while Nicaragua wants to expand and gain territory.

Ex-President of Colombia Álvaro Uribe and Minister of Foreign Affairs Fernando Araújo expressed that Colombia needs to prove that the banks are also part of Colombia. President Uribe said that at the moment the Esguerra-Bárcenas treaty was signed there was nothing stipulated about the banks because Colombia was contesting them with the United States to resolve the sovereignty over these, but not because Nicaragua was claiming these and pointed out that Colombia had already been generous to Nicaragua by ceding the Mosquito Coast which had been previously claimed by Colombia.

Ortega's humanitarian exchange remarks
On December 14, 2007, President Ortega of Nicaragua stirred controversy after making remarks over the Humanitarian exchange process the Colombian government and the FARC guerrilla are undergoing to exchange hostages for prisoners. Ortega opined about the issue calling the FARC "brothers" to free political prisoner Ingrid Betancourt and said that Betancourt's death could be used to cast blame on the FARC.

The Colombian government regarded these remarks as an intervention in internal Colombian affairs and issued a note of protest to Nicaragua. The Colombian government did not consider appropriate the "familiarized language" used to refer to the head of a "narcoterrorist organization".

See also 
 Foreign relations of Colombia
 Foreign relations of Nicaragua
 Territorial disputes of Nicaragua

References

External links 
 Envio: Roots of the Colombia-Nicaragua Territorial Dispute
 ICJ Nicaragua v. Colombia (Preliminary Objections) and (Merits) and 2007 Preliminary Objections Judgment and ASIL and BBC and Colombia President and Colombia MFA and Analysis 20 Hague YIL 75-119 2008

 
Nicaragua
Bilateral relations of Nicaragua